Faith Lutheran Middle School & High School is a private Christian preparatory school located in Summerlin, Nevada. The school, which was founded in 1979, serves grades 6-12, and is affiliated with the Lutheran Church–Missouri Synod. 

The school is the largest non-public school in Nevada with over 2,000 students.

History 
Faith Lutheran was founded in 1979.

In 2017 the school added a 13,181 square foot classroom complex which included the Academy of Business & Entrepreneurship and the Academy of Film and Broadcast.

In 2019 Faith Lutheran was the first school in Nevada to have a varsity hockey team.

During the COVID-19 pandemic in 2020, the school's graduation was at the Las Vegas Motor Speedway and students took a lap after receiving their diploma. In December 2020 the school broke ground on a new $3.4 million dollar tennis complex on campus.

In 2021, the school became the first in Nevada to send a team to the CyberPatriot national finals.

Extracurricular activities

Athletics 
Faith Lutheran's athletics compete in Division 5A of the Nevada Interscholastic Activities Association. The school mascot is a Crusader.

The hockey team practices and plays at City National Arena.

 Fall sports: football, volleyball, cross country, girls' golf, soccer, tennis
 Winter sports: basketball, wrestling, hockey
 Spring sports: baseball, softball, boys' golf, track, swimming, lacrosse

Men's State Championships 
Baseball

2003, 2004, 2005, 2007, 2013, 2014

Basketball

2003, 2005, 2006, 2007, 2008

Cross country

2002, 2003

Football

2013

Golf

2007, 2009, 2014, 2015, 2016

Lacrosse

2017

Tennis

2021

Track and field

1994, 1995, 2004, 2009, 2015

Women's State Championships 
Basketball

2013, 2016

Cross country

1998, 1999, 2000, 2001

Golf

2004, 2012, 2013, 2014, 2015

Soccer

2015, 2019

Tennis

2014

Track and field

1998, 2001, 2002, 2009, 2013, 2014, 2015

Volleyball

2013, 2014, 2015

Swimming

2022

Notable alumni 

 Bowe Becker, Olympic gold medalist
John Molchon, Professional NFL football player
 Brendan Jordan, YouTube personality

References

External links 
Faith Lutheran's Homepage

High schools in Clark County, Nevada
Secondary schools affiliated with the Lutheran Church–Missouri Synod
Buildings and structures in Summerlin, Nevada
Private high schools in Nevada
Private middle schools in Nevada
Lutheran schools in Nevada
Educational institutions established in 1979
1979 establishments in Nevada